Therasia, also known as Thirasía, is an island in the volcanic island group of Santorini in the Greek Cyclades. It lies north-west of Nea Kameni, a small island formed in recent centuries by volcanic activity and thus marking the centre of the island group. Therasia is the second largest island of the group, the largest by far being Thera.

It is part of the municipal unit of Oia (Δημοτική Ενότητα Οίας).

Thera and Therasia were separated by the Thera eruption.

At Knossos, in a LMIIIA context (14th century BC), seven Linear B texts while calling upon "all the gods" make sure to grant primacy to an elsewhere-unattested entity called qe-ra-si-ja and, once, qe-ra-si-jo. However this probably refers to a god or a person rather than to an island *Qherasia > Therasia. Anciently, the island of Therasia possessed a town of the same name.

Thirasia is also the book of Greek poet Dimitris Varos that became a music album and theatrical performance by Greek composer Giannis Markopoulos under the title Daring Communication - Electric Theseus.

Villages
Agía Eiríni (pop. 39 in 2011)
Agrilia (2)
Manolas (160)
Ormos Korfou (5)
Potamos (113)

Historical population

References

External links

Official website 
Official Facebook Page 

 
Santorini
Islands of Greece
Ancient Thera
Landforms of Thira (regional unit)
Islands of the South Aegean
Cyclades
Populated places in Thira (regional unit)
Populated places in the ancient Aegean islands